West Line or Westline may refer to:

 West Line, Chennai Suburban, a railway line in India
 West Line, Missouri, a village in Cass County, USA
 West Line (C-Train), a railway line in Calgary, Alberta, Canada
 West Line Historic District (Austin, Texas)
 Westline, a fictional line describing the movement of the commercial centre of maritime trade over the past 5000 years
 Westline Township, Redwood County, Minnesota, USA

See also
 Western Line (disambiguation)